The 2019 Louisiana State Senate election was held on October 12, 2019, with runoff elections held on November 16, 2019. All 39 seats in the Louisiana State Senate were up for election to four-year terms. Under the Louisiana primary system, all candidates appeared on the same ballot, regardless of party. Five districts held runoff elections due to no candidate receiving a majority of the vote in the general election.

The Republican Party expanded their majority by two seats over the Democratic Party, establishing a veto-proof majority in the Senate against Democratic Governor John Bel Edwards. The party failed to gain a veto-proof majority in the concurrent House elections, however.

Overview

Summary by district

Outgoing incumbents

Republicans 
 District 8: John Alario was term-limited.
 District 9: Conrad Appel was term-limited.
 District 10: Danny Martiny was term-limited.
 District 11: Jack Donahue was term-limited.
 District 13: Dale M. Erdey was term-limited.
 District 16: Dan Claitor was term-limited.
 District 20: Norby Chabert was term-limited.
 District 25: Dan Morrish was term-limited.
 District 30: John R. Smith was term-limited.
 District 31: Gerald Long was term-limited.
 District 32: Neil Riser was term-limited.
 District 33: Mike Walsworth was term-limited.

Democrats 
 District 3: Jean-Paul Morrell was term-limited.
 District 4: Wesley T. Bishop retired.
 District 14: Yvonne Dorsey-Colomb was term-limited.
 District 28: Eric LaFleur was term-limited.
 District 34: Francis C. Thompson was term-limited.

Results

District 1 

Incumbent Republican Sharon Hewitt ran unopposed.

District 2

District 3

District 4 

Democrat Jimmy Harris ran unopposed.

District 5

District 6

District 7 

Incumbent Democrat Troy Carter ran unopposed.

District 8 

Republican Patrick Connick ran unopposed.

District 9

District 10

District 11

District 12

District 13

District 14

District 15

District 16

District 17 

Incumbent Republican Rick Ward III ran unopposed.

District 18 

Incumbent Republican Eddie J. Lambert ran unopposed.

District 19 

Incumbent Democrat Gary Smith Jr. ran unopposed.

District 20

District 21 

Incumbent Republican Bret Allain ran unopposed.

District 22 

Incumbent Republican Fred Mills ran unopposed.

District 23 

Incumbent Republican Page Cortez ran unopposed.

District 24

District 25

District 26

District 27 

Incumbent Republican Ronnie Johns ran unopposed.

District 28

District 29 

Incumbent Democrat Jay Luneau ran unopposed.

District 30

District 31

District 32

District 33

District 34 

Democrat Katrina Jackson ran unopposed.

District 35

District 36

District 37

District 38

District 39

See also 
 2019 Louisiana elections

References 

State Senate
Louisiana State Senate
Louisiana State Senate elections